Old Church Slavonic is an inflectional language with moderately complex verbal and nominal systems.

Nouns

The nominal case category distinguishes 7 cases for nouns, 6 for pronouns and adjectives (no vocative):

Noun syntax

Number
Old Church Slavonic has three numbers: singular, dual, and plural.

The dual, and not the plural, is used for nouns that are two. Nouns found in natural pairs, such as eyes, ears, and hands, are only found rarely in the plural. Due to its consistent use in all Old Church Slavonic texts, it appears to have been a living element of the language. The dual affects adjectives and verbs in addition to nouns.

Nominative case
The nominative is used for the subject of a sentence, but it is only distinguished from the accusative in the masculine plural and the feminine singular, excluding the -declension. Unlike in most modern Slavic languages, the nominative is also typically used for the complement of verbs meaning "to be". It is also used with verbs of naming and calling, but the accusative is also used for these verbs.

Accusative case
The accusative case is used for the direct object of a sentence with transitive verbs. For the masculine  declension, the accusative singular for "an adult, healthy, free male person" is often shown by the use of the endings of the genitive singular. The accusative is also used with nouns for a duration of time and a measure of distance. Old Church Slavonic makes more frequent use of the accusative case after negated infinitives and participles than other Slavic languages, and it is unclear if this is an innovation of Old Church Slavonic or an archaism.

Genitive case
When used with nouns, the genitive frequently denotes the possessor of another noun or "the whole of which the other noun is a part", among other meanings. It is also used frequently with the numerals after five, and with certain pronouns, in the form of the partitive genitive.

The genitive may be used as the complement of the 'verb to' to denote possession, and it replaces the nominative as the complement of 'to be' in impersonal sentences if the verb is negated. It is also used for the object of negated infinitives or participles, and for the objects of certain verbs. It is used after some adjectives, and for objects of comparison after adjectives in the comparative. When recording a date, the month is typically written in the genitive. Unlike other Slavic languages, there is no genitive of time.

Dative case
The dative case is used for the indirect object of a sentence. In addition, it is infrequently used to denote the goal of a motion (its original meaning), but this is more typically shown by using the preposition  followed by the dative. It is also used for the objects of verbs of commanding, obeying, favoring, giving, saying, showing, and promising, as well as for verbs meaning "to seem", and "to be similar to". Additionally, it can be used with nouns and adjectives, particularly in impersonal constructions. It can also be used for a "dative of advantage", showing for whom an action was performed, and as an "ethic dative" that shows "emphasis or emotional involvement". Moreover, the dative can also be used to show possession, typically showing a close relationship between the possessor and the thing possessed, in which form it can occur after the verb "to be" or adjoining the noun possessed. The dative is also used for the "dative absolute" construction, a type of subordinate clause, in which a participle, often with a noun subject, are both placed in the dative.

Instrumental case
The instrumental case can show the "instrument" by which an action was performed, mark "a part of the body or state of mind accompanying the action", and denote the manner in which something was performed. The instrumental can be used to denote measure following a comparison, how many times an action was performed with numerals, an instrumental of place showing over or through what a movement occurs, to denote the time of an action, to mean "in respect to" when use with verbs, adjectives, or other nouns, and to denote the cause of verb, among other meanings. It is also used to denote the agent in passive constructions.

The instrumental is also found rarely for the complement of the verb "to be". It is not found in this meaning in the oldest Old Church Slavonic texts, the Gospels, and only occasionally in later texts.

Locative case
The locative case is used to denote the location in which something occurs. It very rarely occurs without a preceding preposition. Without a preposition, it is only used with place names, as a "locative of place". Due to more frequent use of locatives of place in Old Russian and Old Czech, it is possible that this rarity is caused by Old Church Slavonic following Greek syntax. It is also used, again rarely, for the "locative of time" to denote "in" a certain time. The locative is also used as the object of a small number of verbs; as this construction is extremely rare in other Slavic languages it is most likely an archaic form.

Vocative case
The vocative is used instead of the nominative when a noun is used in isolation as an address or exclamation. Due to this case's consistent use in translations from Greek, in which the vocative is often identical to the nominative, it is clear that it was productive part of the spoken language.

-stems

The only exception are the nouns in  that inflect as u-stem masculines.

Sometimes (but not yet obligatorily, in contrast to later Slavic languages), in the accusative singular, the beginnings of a difference between an animate and inanimate subgender can be seen, as the genitive may occasionally be used instead of the accusative for animate objects ( beside ).

Nouns with the suffix , for example , also belong to this declension class in the singular, but in the plural they lose the  interfix and conform to the consonantal paradigm.

The only exception are the few neuters that are inflected as -stems.

-stems

Nouns belonging to this declension class are masculines ending in   preceded by a palatal in the nominative singular.

This paradigm encompasses nouns such as  that don't appear to be ending in a palatal, but are in fact underlyingly combinations like  and so undergo this declension.

-stems

Nouns belonging to this declension class are feminines ending in   preceded by a hard, non-palatal consonant.

-stems

Noun belonging to this declension class are feminines ending in   preceded by a soft, palatal consonant.

-stems

Nouns belonging to this declension class are masculines ending in   preceded by a hard, non-palatal consonant. The only exception are a limited number of such nouns belonging to the -stem paradigm.

The only exception is the noun  which undergoes -stem (-stem) declension.

-stems

Nouns belonging to this declension are a rather small group of masculines: .

-stems

Nouns belonging to the -stem declension (also known as - declension, or -stem declension) are:  (this last form is attested in Psalterium Sinaiticum; older sources list the accusative form кръвь as a lemma).

-stems

Nouns belonging to this declension class are the following masculines: .

Nouns belonging to this declension class are the following neuters: .

-stems

-stems

The -stem (also known as -stem) paradigm encompasses neuters denoting a young of an animal or human: , etc.

-stems

Pronouns
Personal pronouns

Just as the first and second person pronouns, the third person pronoun is commonly used only in oblique cases. Nominative singular forms are not attested in the OCS corpus, and are reconstructed. In the East South Slavic dialectal area where OCS originated, a suppletive nominative singular stem of the demonstrative  ('that') is used, elsewhere  ('that one there, yon'), or very rarely  ('this').

By attaching the enclitic particle  to the forms of *i one obtains the relative pronoun:  ('he who'),  ('the (female) one to whom'),  ('the two of whom'), etc.

When following prepositions, these pronouns take a prothetic n-, hence  ('to them') instead of *imъ,  ('on him'), etc. This is a remnant of final -m/n in the PIE prepositions *kom (cf. Latin cum, Sanskrit kám), 
sm̥ (cf. Sanskrit sám) and 

The reflexive pronoun has only singular oblique forms, which is the state of affairs inherited from PIE *swé. The reflexive pronoun refers to the subject as a whole, and can be translated as English -self (myself, yourself, himself etc.)

Relative pronoun

As mentioned, the third person pronoun *i participates in the formation of the relative pronoun by appending the indeclinable enclitic . Unlike the third person pronoun, however, the nominative case forms do occur. Similarly, a prothetic n- occurs when following prepositions, e.g.,  ('in which').

Interrogative pronoun and adjective

The interrogative pronoun ('who?, what?') has singular-only forms, with the masculine and feminine forms syncretized. Variant forms of  occurring in some of the oblique cases have been listed in parentheses.

The interrogative adjective, sometimes also labelled as the interrogative pronoun ('which?, what sort of?'), also has some variant forms listed in parentheses.

The possessive interrogative adjective, sometimes also labelled as the possessive interrogative pronoun ('whose?'), follows the same declension.

Indefinite pronouns and adjectives
The interrogative pronouns  can also have the indefinite meanings of 'anybody', 'anything' respectively.

Similarly, the prefix ni- imparts a negative meaning:  ('no one'),  ('nothing'). A prepositions may come between prefix and base word:
  — with someone
  — you care for no one

Adjectives
OCS adjectives can be in two forms: short and long, corresponding to indefinite and definite meaning respectively. The long and short forms of the adjective have distinct syntactical roles. In general the long form is used attributively, whereas the short form is predicative:  'a good man, man is good';  'the good man, the man who is good'. The short form is indefinite in meaning, 'man is good'. The combination of a short-form adjective with substantive is used when the signified entity is presented as new, without prior reference. Hence  'into a furnace, a fiery one'. The long form, by contrast, acts as a pointer and is definite, 'the good man'. The long-form adjective with substantive combination is used when the adjective presents a quality known to be associated with the substantive modified. Hence  'into hell the fiery'. The compound form is often rendered in English by a relative clause: 'into the hell which is fiery'.  Adjectives used as substantives are themselves subject to the long and short form distinction. Again the long form refers to a substantive previously introduced or assumed known. Thus  'they brought to him a blind man... and having taken the blind man by the hand...'.  In a sequence of coordinated participles, when used as substantives, it is typical for only the first to use the long form. The following substantives use the short form. Hence  'he who hears my words and does them...'.

Adjective gradation
There are three levels of adjective gradation in OCS:positive, stating an absolute property of an object;comparative, stating a relative property of an object;superlative, stating a property of an object in relation to any other object it may be compared to.

Comparative
 Adjectives with falling tone on the root syllable:
  ("dear") −  (m),  (n),  (f);
 Adjectives with rising tone on the root syllable:

Declension of the comparative

Superlative
The superlative is formed:
 by combining the comparative form with the pronoun : , .

The absolute superlative is formed:

Numerals
Cardinals
{|
| 1 ||||  (m),  (f),  (n)
|-
| 2 |||| { (m),  (f and n)
|-
| 3 ||||  (m),  (f and n)
|-
| 4 ||||  (m),  (f and n)
|-
| 5 |||| 
|-
| 6 |||| 
|-
| 7 |||| 
|-
| 8 |||| 
|-
| 9 |||| 
|-
| 10 |||| 
|-
| 11 |||| 
|-
| 12 |||| 
|-
| 20 |||| 
|-
| 21 |||| 
|-
| 22 |||| 
|-
| 30 |||| 
|-
| 40 |||| 
|-
| 50 |||| 
|-
| 60 |||| 
|-
| 70 |||| 
|-
| 80 |||| 
|-
| 90 |||| 
|-
| 100 |||| 
|-
| 200 |||| 
|-
| 300 |||| 
|-
| 400 |||| 
|-
| 500 |||| 
|-
| 1 000 |||| 
|-
| 2 000 |||| 
|-
| 5 000 |||| 
|-
| 10 000 ||||  or 
|-
| 20 000 ||||  or 
|-
| 100 000 ||||  or 
|}

Declension of cardinal numbers
{|
| 1 |||| pronominal declension 
|-
| 2 |||| pronominal declension, only in dual
|-
| 3 |||| undergoes i-stem declension, plural forms only
|-
| 4 |||| exactly like , except for the nominative and genitive which undergo consonant-stem declension
|-
|-
| 11–19 |||| only the first component is inflected, e.g. 
|-
| 20, 30, 40 |||| both components are inflected, e.g. 
|-
| 50–90 |||| only the first component is inflected, e.g. 
|}

Ordinals
{|
| 1 |||| 
|-
| 2 |||| 
|-
| 3 |||| 
|-
| 4 |||| 
|-
| 5 |||| 
|-
| 11 |||| 
|-
| 20 |||| 
|-
| 21 |||| 
|-
| 60 |||| 
|-
| 100 |||| 
|-
| 1 000 |||| 
|}

All ordinals are inflected like the corresponding adjectives.

Verbs
Present
The present tense is formed by adding present-tense endings onto the present tense stem, which itself is sometimes hidden due to sound changes that have occurred in the past (more common verbs are listed):

bosti (bod-), vesti (ved- or vez-), krasti (krad-), iti (id-)
plesti (plet-), mesti (met-), greti (greb-), krasti (krad-)
rešti (rek-), pešti (pek-), mošti (mog-), tešti (tek-)

There are several classes of verbs:

1. e-type verbs add the interfix -e- to the present stem (except in front of -ǫ) and the endings:

2. i-type verbs exhibit the same set of endings, but this time the interfix is -i- (except in front of -ǫ and -ę). In the first person singular one finds the processes of iotation (k/c + j > č, g/z + j > ž, x/s + j > š, l + j > lj, n + j > nj, t + j > št, d + j > žd) and epenthesis (bj > blj, pj > plj, mj > mlj, vj > vlj):

3. The athematic verbs byti, dati, věděti, iměti and jasti form the present tense irregularly:

One should distinguish the verbs iměti (imamь, imaši, imatъ), imati (jemljǫ, jemleši, jemletъ) and jęti (imǫ, imeši, imetъ). Exceptional is also the verb xotěti which exhibits iotation even though it's not an i-type verb (xoštǫ, xošteši, xoštetъ).

Aorist
The aorist is used both to narrate individual events taking place at a specific time in the past, "without reference to other events taking place at the same time or subsequently" and to narrate the beginning or end of events of longer duration. Its most important function is to show that an event took place in the past, rather than to show that it is completed.

The aorist form of imperfective verbs is used instead of the perfective aspect in the case of verbs of motion and perception, as well as of the verbs iměti, and jasti. Imperfective verbs in the aorist are also used when an entire action is negated, and may be used for verbs of saying, although the usual form for "he said" is from a perfective verb, reče.

Asigmatic aorist
The asigmatic aorist (also called root or simple aorist) was named after the loss of the phoneme /s/ in the inflection (AGr. sigma), i.e. there is no VsV > VxV change (intervocalic /s/ yielding /x/). Over time, the asigmatic aorist became increasingly marked as an archaic language feature and was eventually replaced by the other two aorist formations.

The asigmatic aorist was formed by adding to the infinitive stem of e-type verbs with stem ending in a consonant (i.e. verbs with the infix -nǫ-, which is dropped before the aorist endings, and verbs with the null infix) the following endings: -ъ, -e, -e; -omъ, -ete, -ǫ; -ově, -eta, -ete.

Sigmatic aorist
The sigmatic or s-aorist was formed in the following ways:

Verbs whose stem ends in b, p, d, t, z, s form this aorist by dropping the final consonant and adding the interfix -s- plus the endings -ъ, -, -; -omъ, -te, -ę; -ově, -ta, -te. Intervocalic sigma (s) exhibits no change. As a side effect, e is lengthened to ě, and o to a.
Verbs whose stem ends in r or k form this aorist in the same way as previously mentioned, except that intervocalic sigma (s) changes into x, the same set of endings being suffixed to the interfix. As a side effect, e is lengthened to ě, and o to a.
Verbs whose stem ends in a vowel form this aorist by suffixing exactly the same set of endings to the infinitive stem, and intervocalic -s- changes into -x-.

The 2nd and 3rd person singular forms of these verbs match the infinitive stem due to the elision of word-final sigma.

New aorist
The new aorist (also known as ox-aorist) is formed by suffixing to the infinitive stem of e-type verbs ending in a consonant (verbs with the interfix -nǫ- and verbs with the null interfix) the interfix -os- (-ox) and onto it the endings -ъ, -, -; -omъ, -te, -ę; -ově, -ta, -te. Intervocalic sigma s changes into x.

The 2nd and the 3rd person singular forms are not attested and thus the asigmatic aorist forms are taken as a replacement.

Imperfect
The imperfect is used either for continuous or repeated actions in the past. It is typically used to form a background in a narration, and forms a contrast with the aorist and other verb forms: it often shows that an action took place at the same time as another. Actions in the imperfect are almost always incomplete, and the tense is typically only used with verbs in the imperfective aspect. Rarely, it can be formed with perfective verbs.

There are two ways of forming the imperfect:

1. If the infinitive stems ends in -a or -ě, the interfix -ax- is appended (which changes to -aš- according to the first palatalization in front of e) and onto it, the endings of the asigmatic aorist: -ъ, -e, -e; -omъ, -ete, -ǫ; -ově, -eta, -ete.

2. The other way of forming the imperfect, applying to all other verbal stems, is by adding onto the present stem the interfix -ěax- (which, in accordance with the first palatalization, is changed to -ěaš- in front of e) and onto it the endings of asigmatic aorist: -ъ, -e, -e; -omъ, -ete, -ǫ; -ově, -eta, -ete.

Both of these imperfect formations often occur side by side in verbs with stem alternation:
bьrati (bьra-; ber-) > bьraaxъ or berěaxъ
gъnati (gъna-; žen-) > gъnaaxъ or ženěaxъ
plьvati (plьva-; pljuj-) > plьvaaxъ or pljujěaxъ
zъvati (zъva-; zov-) > zъvaaxъ or zověaxъ

In the texts of the OCS canon the forms are often contracted, so that ěax becomes ěx and aax becomes ax. An illustrating example is in Chernorizets Hrabar's famous work O pismenex "An Account of Letters":
Prěžde ubo slověne ne iměxǫ knigъ, nǫ črъtami i rězami čьtěxǫ i gataaxǫ, pogani sǫšte.

Some forms exhibit sound changes, namely palatalization or iotation in front of ě, yat thus turning into a. The same applies if the stem ends in j which is then reduced in front of yat and yat again changes into a:
xvaliti (xval-) > xval + ě + axъ > xvaljaaxъ
nositi (nos-) > nos + ě + axъ > nošaaxъ
pešti (pek-) > pek + ě + axъ > pečaaxъ
čuti (čuj-) > čuj + ě + axъ > čujaaxъ

That the second form and not the first is the original one (the first being formed by the change of yat to a) is confirmed by the imperfect paradigm of the verb byti:

Participles
Present active participle
The present active participle is formed by adding the following endings to the present stem:

1. e-type verbs and athematic verbs:
 present stem + -y (masculine and neuter) and -ǫšti (feminine)
(e.g., greti (greb-) > greby; grebǫšti)

2. e-type verbs whose present stem ends in a palatal:
 present stem + -ę (masculine and neuter) and -ǫšti (feminine)
(e.g., kupovati (kupuj-) > kupuję, kupujǫšti)

3. i-type verbs:
 present stem + -ę (masculine and neuter) and -ęšti (feminine)
(e.g., ljubiti (ljub-) > ljubę, ljubęšti)

Present passive participle
The present passive participle is formed by suffixing to the present stem the endings -o/e/i + m + ъ/a/o (masculine, feminine, neuter):

1. e-type verbs and athematic verbs:
 present stem + o + m + ъ/a/o(e.g., pešti (pek-) > pekomъ, pekoma, pekomo)

2. e-type verbs whose stem ends in a palatal:
 present stem + e + m + ъ/a/o(e.g., želeti (želj-) > željemъ, željema, željemo)

3. i-type verbs:
 present stem + i + m + ъ/a/o(e.g., xvaliti (xval-) > xvalimъ, xvalima, xvalimo)

Past active participle
The past active participle is formed by suffixing to the infinitive stem the following endings:

1. e-type verbs and athematic verbs:
 infinitive stem + -ъ (masculine and neuter) or -ъši (feminine)
(e.g., bosti (bod-) > bodъ, bodъši)

2. i-type verbs exhibit epenthetic v, which eliminates hiatus:
 infinitive stem + -vъ (masculine and neuter) or -vъši (feminine)
(e.g., xvaliti (xvali-) > xvalivъ, xvalivъši)

The latter i-type verbs have twofold forms of this participle – the mentioned one of older origin, and a newer one which arose due to analogical leveling:
 nositi (nosi-) > nošъ, nošъši (by iotation from + jъ, jъši) or nosivъ, nosivъši
 roditi (rod-) > roždъ, roždъši (by iotation from + jъ, jъši) or rodivъ, rodivъši

3. Verbs with liquid metathesis form this participle from its older stem form:
 mrěti (< *merti) > mьrъ, mьrъši (and not mrěvъ, mrěvъši)
 prostrěti (< *prosterti) > prostьrъ, prostьrъši (and not prostrěvъ, prostrěvъši)

4. Irregular participles:
 iti > šьdъ, šьdъši
 jaxati > javъ, javъši

l-participle
The l-participle (also known as the resultative participle or second past active participle) is formed by adding to the infinitive stem the interfix -l- and the endings ъ/a/o. If the stem ends in -t or -d, this consonant is dropped.
 xvaliti (xvali) > xvalilъ, xvalila, xvalilo
 plesti (plet-) > plelъ, plela, plelo

Past passive participle
The past passive participle is formed by suffixing to the infinitive stem the following endings:

1. Verbs with stem ending in a consonant, -y or -i:
 infinitive stem + en + ъ/a/o(e.g., bosti (bod-) > bodenъ, bodena, bodeno)
(e.g., nositi (nosi-) > nošenъ, nošena, nošeno – by iotation from nosi + enъ > nosjenъ > nošenъ)
(e.g., umyti with interfix -ъv- > umъvenъ, umъvena, umъveno)

2. Verbs with stem ending in -a or -ě:
 infinitive stem + n + ъ/a/o(e.g., glagolati (glagola-) > glagolanъ, glagolana, glagolano)
(e.g., viděti (vidě-) > vižden, viždena, viždeno – by iotation from viděn, viděna, viděno)

3. Verbs with stem ending in -ę, -u, -i and -ě (obtained by liquid metathesis):
 infinitive stem + t + ъ/a/o(e.g., klęti (klę-) > klętъ, klęta, klęto)
(e.g., obuti (obu-) > obutъ, obuta, obuto)
(e.g., mrěti (mrě-) > mrětъ, mrěta, mrěto)
(e.g., viti (vi-) > vitъ, vita, vito)

Of the latter verbs, those with stem ending in -i (viti, biti etc.) can also form the past passive participle like the verbs in the first group: bitъ or bijenъ, vitъ or vijenъ etc.).

Compound tenses
Perfect
The perfect is formed by combining the l-participle with the imperfective present forms of the auxiliary verb byti.

nosilъ/a/o jesmь, jesi, jestъ
nosili/y/a jesmъ, jeste, sǫtь
nosila/ě/ě jesvě, jesta, jeste

Pluperfect
The pluperfect can be formed in multiple ways, by combining the l-participle with the perfect, imperfect or aorist formation of the auxiliary verb byti.
nosilъ/a/o bylъ/a/o jesmь or běaxъ or běxъ
nosili/y/a byli/y/a jesmъ or běaxomъ or běxomъ
nosila/ě/ě byla/ě/ě jesvě or běaxově or běxově

Future
The future tense is usually expressed using the present tense form of the perfective verb. Imperfective verbs form the future tense by combining the auxiliary verb (byti, xotěti, načęti, iměti) and the infinitive.
bǫdǫ / xoštǫ / načьnǫ / imamь xvaliti

Future perfect
The future perfect is formed by combining the l-participle with the perfective present of the auxiliary verb byti.
 nosilъ/a/o bǫdǫ, bǫdeši, bǫdetъ
 nosili/y/a bǫdemъ, bǫdete, bǫdǫtъ
 nosila/ě/ě bǫdevě, bǫdeta, bǫdete

Conditional
The conditional (or conditional-optative) modal formation is formed by combining the l-participle with special modal forms of the auxiliary verb byti (with unattested dual forms):
nosilъ/a/o bimь, bi, bi
nosili/y/a bimъ, biste, bǫ/bišę

An alternative conditional is formed with the perfective aorist forms of byti:
nosilъ/a/o byxъ, by, by
nosili/y/a byxomъ, byste, byšę

Adverbs
Primary adverbs
These are original adverbs with difficult to guess etymology and origin.abьje (abije) = right awayjedъva = hardly, barelyješte = yet, stillnyně = now, todaypaky = again, back(j)uže = already

Derived adverbs
Pronominal adverbs
Pronominal adverbs are derived by suffixing pronouns (e.g., ov + amo = ovamo, kъ + de = kъde):-amo = direction of movement (tamo, kamo, onamo)-ako / -ače = way, mode, manner (tako, inako, inače)-de = place (sьde, onude, vьsьde)-gda = time (tъgda, kъgda, egda)-lь / -li / / -lě / -lьma / -lьmi = measure, amount (kolь, kolě, kolьmi)

Nominal adverbs
Nominal adverbs are derived from nominals or turn by conversion to adverbs which are in fact inflective lexemes with adverbial semantics.

Modal adverbs are created with the suffixes -o or -ě (the endings of accusative and locative singular neuter gender respectively), with no difference in meanings between suffixes, although some adverbs have only the forms in -o (veselo), and some in -ě (javě).

Modal adverbs could also be formed deadjectivally by means of the interfix -ьsk- and the ending -y (by origin, the instrumental plural ending; e.g., slověnьsky).

Adverbs could also be formed with the suffix -ь (pravь, različь) and are by origin probably inherited Proto-Slavic accusative forms.

Frequently occurring are the adverbialized a-stem instrumentals such as jednьnojǫ and also adverbially used oblique cases.

Locative adverbs are by origin mostly petrified locative case forms of nouns: gorě, dolě, nizu, and the same can be said for temporal adverbs: zimě, polu dьne.

Prepositions
Primary prepositions
The primary and non-derived prepositions are of PIE and PSl. heritage:bez "without" + Giz or is "from, out" + G
izdrǫky < iz rǫky — from the handkъ "to, for, unto" + D
..reče že Marθa kъ Iisusu.. — and Martha said unto Jesusna "on, to, upon" + A (denoting direction) or L (denoting place)
zlijašę ognь na zemьjǫ — they poured fire on earthnadъ "on, upon, over" + A (denoting direction) or I (denoting place)
nadъ glavǫ — over the heado or ob "over, round, about" + A (denoting direction) or L (denoting place)
ob noštь vьsǫ — the whole night throughotъ "from, away" + G
otъ nebese — from heavenpo originally "under, below" + D (extension in space), A (extension in space or time) or L (temporal and local)
po vьsę grady — through all towns
po tomь že — after that
po morjǫ xodę — walking over the seapodъ "under, beneath" + A (denoting direction) or I (denoting situation, location)
podъ nogy, podъ nogama — under the feetpri "at, at the time" + L
pri vraƷěxъ — among the heathenprědъ "in front of, before" + A (denoting direction) or I (denoting situation)
prědъ gradomь — in the vicinity of the citysъ "for the extent of" + A, "from, off, away" + G, "with" + I (denoting association, not instrument)
sъ lakъtь — a cubit long
sъ nebese — down from heaven
sъ nimь — with himu "at, in" + G
u dvьrьcь — at the doorsvъ "in" + A (denoting direction) or L (denoting place)
vъ tъ dьnь — that day
vъ kupě — togethervъz or vъs "for, in exchange for" + A
vъs kǫjǫ — why?za "for, after, behind" + A (denoting direction), I (denoting place) or G (in the sense "because")
ęti za vlasy — to seize by the hair

Secondary prepositions
The secondary prepositions are derived from adverbial expressions: vьslědъ from vь slědъ, prěžde is a comparative form of prědъ etc.

Conjunctions and particles
Conjunctions and particles are not easily separable because they sometimes function as an intensifier, and sometimes as a conjunction.a, ali "but" – (proclitic), setting two parts of a statement in oppositionako, jako, ěko "that, so that, how, when, as" – (proclitic) introducing indirect or direct speech; highly context-dependentašte "if, whether" – (proclitic) a conditional particle, also used to generalize relative pronounsbo "for, because" – (enclitic) denoting caustive relationships (i + bo = ibo, u + bo = ubo)da "in order that" – (proclitic) introducing final resulti "and; even, too" – (proclitic) connecting clauses or used as an adverb within a clauseide "for, since" – (proclitic)jegda, jegdaže "when, if" – (proclitic)jeda "surely not" – (proclitic), introducing a question expecting a negative answerli "or", li...li "either... or" – (proclitic or enclitic) generally when forming a question; when enclitic, usually a direct question, when proclitic, taking the meaning "or"ne "not", ne...ni "neither... nor" – ne generally occurs before the negated item, occurring usually once in the main clause, but ni may occur several times in the same clausenъ "but" – (proclitic) connecting two clausesto "then, so" – (proclitic) correlative to ašteže''' "on the other hand, or, and" – (enclitic) the commonest particle functioning both as an intensifier and a conjunction; often bound to pronouns and adverbs (jakože, nikъto že)

Notes

References
 
 
 

 

External links
  Gramatika jezika hèrvatskoga: Osnovana na starobugarskoj slověnštini, Vatroslav Jagić, 1864
  Старобългарски език — кратък граматичен очерк'', Кирил Мирчев, София 1972
  Old Church Slavonic Online, University of Texas at Austin
  Abecedarium Palaeoslovenicum in usum glagolitarum, Josip Vajs, Veglae 1909.
  Кульбакин С. М. Древнецерковнославянский язык. I. Введение. Фонетика. — Kharkiv, 1911
  Research Guide to Old Church Slavonic

Grammar, Old Church Slavonic
Slavic grammars